Patriarch Anthony of Constantinople may refer to:

 Anthony I of Constantinople, Ecumenical Patriarch in 821–837
 Anthony II of Constantinople, Ecumenical Patriarch in 893–901
 Anthony III of Constantinople, Ecumenical Patriarch in 974–979
Anthony IV of Constantinople, Ecumenical Patriarch in 1389–1390 and 1391–1397